Southside Baptist Christian School is a private Christian school located on the southside of Richmond, Virginia. It is a Christian school and is part of Southside Baptist Ministries. The school is mostly known for its basketball, volleyball and ensemble which perform throughout the city.

References

External links 
School Website

Baptist schools in the United States
Christian schools in Virginia
Schools in Richmond, Virginia
Private K-12 schools in Virginia